Sébastien Cazenove (born 28 December 1976) is a French politician of La République En Marche! (LREM) who served as member of the French National Assembly from 2017 to 2022 French, representing Pyrénées-Orientales's 4th constituency.

Political career
In parliament, Cazenove served on the Committee on Economic Affairs. In addition to his committee assignments, he was a member of the French-Andorran Parliamentary Friendship Group.

He lost his seat to Michèle Martinez from the National Rally in the 2022 French legislative election.

Political positions
In July 2019, Cazenove voted in favour of the French ratification of the European Union’s Comprehensive Economic and Trade Agreement (CETA) with Canada.

See also
 2017 French legislative election

References

1976 births
Living people
Deputies of the 15th National Assembly of the French Fifth Republic
La République En Marche! politicians
Place of birth missing (living people)

21st-century French politicians
People from Perpignan